Neora Valley National Park is a national park in Kalimpong district, West Bengal, India that was established in 1986. It is the land of the red panda in the pristine undisturbed natural habitat with rugged inaccessible hilly terrain and rich diverse flora and fauna. It is linked to Pangolakha Wildlife Sanctuary of Pakyong District as well as forests of Samtse District, Bhutan via thick cover of forests.

Geography

The highest point is Rachela Danda. The forest in Neora Valley has such luxurious growth that even sunlight finds it difficult to touch the ground. Much of the park is still inaccessible, making it an adventurous place for the nature lovers/trekkers who can take the challenge to explore the still-unknown terrain in the Kalimpong district hills. Virgin natural forests, dense bamboo groves, colourful canopy of Rhododendron trees, lush green valley, meandering rivers and streams with snowcapped mountains in the backdrop form a picturesque landscape. It borders Pakyong District and Samtse Bhutan. The Neora River is the major water source for Kalimpong town.

Biodiversity

Avian fauna listed from this park are of A1, A2 and A3 categories with IBA site code IN-WB-06.

The primary biomes inside Neora Vally National Park are:
 Sino-Himalayan Temperate Forest of the Eastern Himalayan broadleaf forests Biome 7
 Sino-Himalayan Subtropical Forest of the Himalayan subtropical broadleaf forests Biome 8
 Indo-Chinese Tropical Moist Forest of the Himalayan subtropical pine forests Biome 9

Flora
Neora Valley sustains a unique ecosystem where tropical, sub-tropical, sub-temperate, and temperate vegetative system still harbours a wealth of flora and fauna. The forests consists of mixed species like rhododendron, bamboo, oak, ferns, sal, etc. The valley also has numerous species of orchids, some of which are endemic to the park. Common species of rhododendron that grow in the park include Rhododendron arboreum, Rhododendron falconeri, and Rhododendron dalhousiae.

Fauna

Mammals reported from this area are Indian leopard, five viverrid species, Asiatic black bear, sloth bear, Asian golden cat, wild boar, leopard cat, goral, serow, barking deer, sambar deer, flying squirrel and tahr, red panda, clouded leopard.
The semi-evergreen forests between  host rufous-throated partridge, satyr tragopan, crimson-breasted woodpecker, Darjeeling woodpecker, bay woodpecker, golden-throated barbet, Hodgson's hawk cuckoo, lesser cuckoo, brown wood owl, ashy wood pigeon, mountain imperial pigeon, Jerdon's baza, black eagle, mountain hawk eagle, dark-throated thrush, rufous-gorgeted flycatcher, white-gorgeted flycatcher, white-browed bush robin, white-tailed robin, yellow-browed tit, striated bulbul, chestnut-headed tesia, chestnut-crowned warbler, black-faced warbler, black-faced laughingthrush, chestnut-crowned laughingthrush, streak-breasted scimitar babbler, scaly-breasted cupwing, pygmy cupwing, rufous-fronted babbler, black-headed shrike babbler, white-browed shrike-babbler, rusty-fronted barwing, rufous-winged fulvetta, brown parrotbill, fire-breasted flowerpecker, fire-tailed sunbird, maroon-backed accentor, dark-breasted rosefinch, red-headed bullfinch, gold-naped finch.

Reptilian fauna includes King cobra, common krait, green pit viper, blind snake, lizards. Insects include butterflies, moths, beetles, bees, wasps, bugs and cicadas.

See also
 Pangolakha Wildlife Sanctuary
 Gorumara National Park
 Chapramari Wildlife Sanctuary

References

External links
 West Bengal Forest Development Corporation Ltd. - Lava
 UNESCO World Heritage Center - Tentative List
 Neora Valley National Park marked on OpenStreetMap

Eastern Himalayan broadleaf forests
National parks in West Bengal
Protected areas established in 1986
1986 establishments in West Bengal
Tourist attractions in Kalimpong district
World Heritage Tentative List for India